Aclyvolva is a genus of sea snails, marine gastropod mollusks in the family Ovulidae.

Species
Species within the genus Aclyvolva include:
 Aclyvolva coarctata (G. B. Sowerby II, 1848)
Aclyvolva granularis Ma, 1986
Aclyvolva lanceolata (Sowerby, 1848)
Aclyvolva nicolamassierae Fehse, 1999
Species brought into synonymy
Aclyvolva clara Cate, 1973 : synonym of Calcarovula gracillima (E. A. Smith, 1901)
Aclyvolva haynesi (Sowerby, 1889) : synonym of Pellasimnia angasi (Reeve, 1865)
Aclyvolva lamyi (Schilder, 1932): synonym of Pellasimnia angasi (Reeve, 1865)
Aclyvolva vulgaris Ma, 1986 : synonym of Hiatavolva coarctata (Sowerby in A. Adams & Reeve, 1848)
Nomen dubium
Aclyvolva framea Cate, 1973 (nomen dubium)

References

External links

Ovulidae